Alfonso Martinez is a Belizean taekwondo martial artist residing in Taiwan. He represented Belize at the 2008 Summer Olympics in Beijing.

References

Year of birth missing (living people)
Living people
Olympic taekwondo practitioners of Belize
Taekwondo practitioners at the 2008 Summer Olympics
Belizean male taekwondo practitioners
Taekwondo practitioners at the 2007 Pan American Games
Pan American Games competitors for Belize